William Joseph Reed (November 12, 1922 – December 5, 2005) was an American Major League Baseball second baseman. He was originally signed by the Philadelphia Phillies in 1946 and later played at the Major League level with the Boston Braves in 1952.

Reed attended the University of Notre Dame.

Basketball career
Reed also played professional basketball. During the winter season in 1946–47, he played for the Oshkosh All-Stars in the National Basketball League and averaged 2.6 points per game.

References

1922 births
2005 deaths
United States Army personnel of World War II
American men's basketball players
Baseball players from Wisconsin
Basketball players from Wisconsin
Boston Braves players
Evansville Braves players
Forwards (basketball)
Green Bay Bluejays players
Hartford Chiefs players
Major League Baseball second basemen
Milwaukee Brewers (minor league) players
Notre Dame Fighting Irish baseball players
Notre Dame Fighting Irish men's basketball players
Oshkosh All-Stars players
People from Shawano, Wisconsin
Ripon College (Wisconsin) alumni
St. Norbert College alumni
Toledo Mud Hens players
Toledo Sox players